Circle Dogs is a children's picture book written by Kevin Henkes and illustrated by Dan Yaccarino. It was published in 1998 by Greenwillow Books. The story is about a day in the life of two dachshunds (the titular "circle dogs", so called because of the shape they make when sleeping) and the family they live with.

Awards and reception
The book was named a Charlotte Zolotow Award "Highly Commended Title" in 1999, being praised for its description of life with playful dogs as seen by a young child, "illustrations [that] are at once sophisticated and childlike", and overall "old-fashioned feel", comparing it to the writing of Margaret Wise Brown. The book also received a positive review in The New York Times, with James McMullan calling it "an evocative piece of writing that would be a joy to read aloud to a child." He also praised the illustrations, but felt that they were not necessarily a good match for the story.

References

1998 children's books
American picture books
Children's fiction books
Books about dogs
Greenwillow Books books